The 2015 Tour de Corse (formally the 58ème Tour de Corse) was the eleventh round of the 2015 World Rally Championship. The race was held over four days between 1 October and 4 October 2015, and operated out of Ajaccio, Corsica, France. Volkswagen's Jari-Matti Latvala won the race, his 15th win in the World Rally Championship.

This is the most recent World Rally Championship event to have more than 100 starters.

Special stages

References

Corse, Tour de
Tour de Corse
Corse, Tour de
October 2015 sports events in France